Bohlinryggen is a mountain ridge in Wedel Jarlsberg Land at Spitsbergen, Svalbard. It has a length of about 4.5 kilometers, and the highest peak is 716 m.a.s.l. It is located between the glaciers Scottbreen and Renardbreen. The ridge is named after Swedish astronomer Karl Bohlin.

References

Mountains of Spitsbergen